Lie Sim Djwe, who also published under the name Lie Sien Djioe, was a Chinese Indonesian writer, journalist and translator active in the Dutch East Indies and Indonesia from the 1910s until the 1950s. His major contribution was the translation of Chinese-language novels into Malay.

Biography
Little is known about Lie's early life, although he was probably born in Java or Sumatra at around the turn of the twentieth century. Although he published in some Padang, West Sumatra publications throughout his life, he also regularly worked and published in Surabaya (specifically Gresik Regency) and so he most likely lived there.

He continued to translate and published steadily for the next few decades; he was especially interested in historical novels (Wuxia, cloak-and-dagger) which were going out of fashion at around this time, as well as short stories with contemporary plots relating to heroic figures of the 1911 Revolution and its aftermath. Many of them were adapted from well-known historical Chinese novels, whereas others seem to be based on anonymous or now-forgotten works.

In 1918 he worked for a Surabaya bimonthly magazine named The Young Republican. The magazine was persecuted by Dutch authorities by 1920 and shut down after being accused of Bolshevism. He was also editor-in-chief of the paper  in Grissee in the early 1920s. During that time he also worked at a bookstore and published named Pek & Co., which published some of his books.

At some point he was also editor of another literary magazine called .

After Indonesia gained its independence from the Dutch in 1949 he founded  which was a monthly magazine focused on translations of martial arts (Silat) and cloak-and-dagger tales.

The circumstances of his later life and death are unknown.

Selected works
  (1922, published by Pek Co. in Surabaya, probably a Chinese translated work)
  (1931, serialized in )
  (1933, 6 volumes, translation of Chinese novel "The Pavilion for Contemplating the Moon")
  (1933)
  (1933, translation of a Chinese novel printed in Jombang)
  (1950, printed in 
  (date unknown, a novel printed in Surabaya)

References

Chinese Indonesian culture
Indonesian writers
Indonesian people of Chinese descent
20th-century Indonesian writers
Indonesian translators
20th-century Chinese translators
Date of birth unknown
Date of death unknown